James C. Self House is a historic home in Greenwood, South Carolina, designed by local architect Thomas White Cothran (1874-1923) for textile magnate and philanthropist James Cuthbert Self (1876-1955) and built in 1917–1918. The house is a two-story, brick veneer Neoclassical style dwelling with a green Spanish tile hipped roof. It sits on a brick foundation faced with rock and an Ionic order portico that projects from the three central bays. The property includes a smokehouse/wellhouse and garage.

It was listed on the National Register of Historic Places in 1987.

References

Houses on the National Register of Historic Places in South Carolina
Neoclassical architecture in South Carolina
Houses completed in 1918
National Register of Historic Places in Greenwood County, South Carolina
Houses in Greenwood County, South Carolina
Buildings and structures in Greenwood, South Carolina